NLHS may refer to:
 New Lisbon High School, New Lisbon, Wisconsin, United States
 New London High School (disambiguation)
 North Lincoln High School, Lincolnton, North Carolina, United States
 Northern Lehigh High School, Slatington, Pennsylvania, United States
 Northland Lutheran High School, Kronenwetter, Wisconsin, United States
 National Neili Senior High School, Chungli, Taoyuan, Taiwan